I Woke Up Early the Day I Died is a 1998 American camp black comedy film, based on a unproduced screenplay  written by Edward D. Wood Jr. in 1974. Wood originally wrote the script in 1961 as Silent Night, then rewrote it in 1974 as I Awoke Early the Day I Died, but he died before he could get it filmed.

The 1998 film, directed by Aris Iliopulos, stars Billy Zane, Tippi Hedren, Ron Perlman, Sandra Bernhard, Karen Black, Eartha Kitt, Summer Phoenix and Christina Ricci, among many others. The film has no dialogue, only atmospheric sounds, alternating bursts of laughter, and screams. Several of Ed Wood's old friends from the 1950s were featured in bit parts, including Maila Nurmi, Conrad Brooks, David Ward and Wood's widow Kathy O'Hara Wood.

Plot

Overpowering a nurse and dressing in her clothes, a madman escapes from the Casa de la Loco Sanitarium. The Thief (Billy Zane) then goes on a crime spree that nets him a gun, a car, a fortune in stolen cash, and one dead loan office manager. As he escapes the murder scene, he comes upon a forbidden cemetery just as a burial is taking place, replete with bagpipe music and a bizarre ceremony employing tuning forks and strange icons. As the undertaker, the caretaker, and an odd assortment of mourners leave the service, The Thief peers into the coffin, thinking it is a good place to hide his briefcase full of ill-gotten gains. As he strikes the tuning fork that is buried with the robe-draped skeleton, bagpipe music fills the air and throws him into convulsions. The coffin lid slams shut, locking his money inside, and The Thief is thrown into an open grave, knocking himself unconscious. When he awakens, he sets off to track down everyone who had been present at the funeral in an attempt to find his missing cash, killing anyone who gets in his way.

Cast

 Billy Zane as The Thief
 Ron Perlman as Cemetery Caretaker
 Tippi Hedren as Maylinda Austed / Professional Mourner
 Andrew McCarthy as Cop
 Will Patton as Preacher
 Carel Struycken as Undertaker
 Max Perlich as Assistant Undertaker
 Patrick Painter as Assistant Undertaker #2
 John Ritter as Robert Forrest / Professional Mourner
 Karen Black as Honey Child
 Sandra Bernhard as Sandy Sands / Professional Mourner and Stripper
 Eartha Kitt as Cult Leader
 Ann Magnuson as Loan Secretary
 Abraham Benrubi as Bouncer
 Christina Ricci as Teenage Hooker
 Jonathan Taylor Thomas as Boy At Beach
 Michael Greene as Tom Harris, Professional Mourner / Barfly
 Roberta Hanley as Housewife
 Robert Musselman as Eartha Kitt's Escort
 Marvin Lorence as Eartha Kitt's Piano Player 
 Megan Odebash as Wardrobe Mistress
 Rain Phoenix as Bartender #1
 Summer Phoenix as Bartender #2 / Girl At The Beach
 Steven M. Porter as Detective #2
 Jed Reghanti as Prom King
 Tara Reid as Prom Queen / Nightclub Bartender
 Joann Richter as Woman At Supermarket
 Kathleen Robertson as Ticket Girl
 Mark Rolston as Hot Dog Vendor
 David Ward as Cruiser Cop #1
 Rick Schroder as Cruiser Cop #2
 Nicollette Sheridan as Ballroom Woman
 Gregory Sporleder as Loan Manager
 Steven Weber as Policeman In Alley
 Kathleen O'Hara Wood as Woman At Carnival
 Billie Worley as Fat Taxi Driver
 Lee Arenberg as Parking Lot Attendant
 Mark Boone Junior as Cop #3
 Conrad Brooks as Cruise Cop #3
 Joseph Darrell as Uniform Cop #1
 Leif Garret as Cruiser Cop #4
 Dana Gould as Carnival Barker
 Michael G. Hagerty as Flop House Manager
 Brent Hinkley as Detective #1
 Jeff Horny as "Smokey"
 Denice D. Lewis as Star Stripper
 Blake Lindsley as Ticket Girl
 Anna Austin as Nurse
 Maila Nurmi as Woman In Hotel Lobby
 Donita Ganzon Gold as Savannah
 Bud Cort as Shopkeeper Lord Heinrich "Binky" Alcoa III
 Louise Ashby as Show Girl (uncredited)
 Angella Kaye as Girl (uncredited)
 Celeste Octavia as Ballerina (uncredited)
 John Patrick Patti as Pimp (uncredited)
 Roberto Santana as Conga Player (uncredited)
 Tilghman Branner as Policeman In Alley / Snakewoman Cirus

Production

The movie, produced two decades after Edward D. Wood Jr.'s death, was done as a tribute to him. Wood was awarded a posthumous Golden Turkey Award for being The Worst Director Of All Time, and has since gained a cult following. The producers of this film used many techniques that Wood himself would use, such as including stock footage to save filming expenses. The cast was made up of a huge list of actors, including several who were previously associated with Wood's films in the 1950s.

Reaction

The film received negative reactions by fans and critics alike, achieving a 30% rating on Rotten Tomatoes. Many criticized Iliopulos's failure to recreate Wood's innocent ineptitude at film making, including Entertainment Weekly, which said the movie "never truly finds a way to evoke [Wood's] fractured hard-boiled syntax, his inimitable idiocy".

Music 

The instrumental soundtrack for the film was composed by Larry Groupé and recorded and mixed by John Kurlander.

Instrumental Soundtrack Track listing

"Escape!" – 2:05
"My Kingdom For A Hot Dog" – 2:15
"My Ears Hurt" – 1:20
"Parking Booth Fight" – 0:54
"The Bank Job Tango" – 3:30
"Scaffold Dream" – 2:40
"Cult Waltz & Processional" – 3:57
"Caretaker's Lament" – 1:51
"Cemetery Knight" – 1:42
"Coppers" – 1:21
"Journey Continues" – 0:45
"Where's The Money?" – 0:58
"Caretaker's Death" – 1:18
"Mausoleum" – 1:30
"The Coffin Has No Money" – 2:23
"Shack Attack" – 2:16
"Purse Snatch" – 1:29
"Desperation" – 2:03
"Head Over Heels" – 1:20
"Torment And Woe" – 1:59
"Journey Smoke" – 1:03
"Long Ride Home" – 1:00
"Bagpipes Of Death" – 3:36

Additional Music
There is additional music featured in the film that was not composed by Groupé. These songs were never released in compilation as a soundtrack to the film. The following is the listing of songs as they appear in the end credits of the film.

 Jesus I Was Evil by Darcy Clay
 Plastic Bag by Minty
 Minty by Minty
 Puttin’ and Takin' by The Ink Spots
 Geezer by ZVH
 Courtesy Phone by ZVH
 El Guapo by ZVH
 Elephant Graveyeard by ZVH
 Sandy Dance by ZVH
 Bink e Bink by Lisa Zane
 Love of Life by Gene Bua
 If You Want To Go Away by Nico Fidenco
 Anywhere I Hang My Heart by Eartha Kitt
 Heavy Water by Ray Davies and His Funky Trumpet
 Nature Boy by Nat King Cole
 Inside the Hut by Nathan Haines
 Adios al Presidio by Los Hermanos Vega
 Opera Buffa by Penelope Anderson
 Circus Macabra by Frank Macchia
 Temper by Goldie

See also
Ed Wood filmography

References

Sources
 The Haunted World of Edward D. Wood, Jr. (1996), documentary film directed by Brett Thompson
 Rudolph Grey, Nightmare of Ecstasy: The Life and Art of Edward D. Wood, Jr. (1992)

External links 
 
 
 
 

1998 films
1990s black comedy films
1990s serial killer films
American black comedy films
American psychological films
American serial killer films
Films about murderers
Films scored by Larry Groupé
Films with screenplays by Ed Wood
Psychological comedy films
Films without speech
1998 comedy films
1999 comedy films
1999 films
1990s English-language films
1990s American films